Christopher Bush (born 13 February 1992) is an Australian footballer who plays for Dapto Dandaloo Fury.

Club career
Bush was promoted to the Brisbane Roar senior team after Reinaldo departed the club in order to meet the 20 player minimum imposed on A-League clubs.

Career statistics
(Correct as of 29 December 2013)

Honours
With Australia:
 AFF U-19 Youth Championship: 2010
 AFF U-16 Youth Championship: 2008

References

External links
 Brisbane Roar profile
 FFA - Joeys profile
 FFA - Young Socceroos profile

1992 births
Living people
Brisbane Roar FC players
Australian soccer players
Association football midfielders
A-League Men players
Australian Institute of Sport soccer players
People from Goulburn
Sportsmen from New South Wales
Soccer players from New South Wales